Pekka Paavolainen (30 December 1868 – 12 January 1930) was a Finnish lawyer, civil servant and politician. He served as a member of the Parliament of Finland from 1913 to 1919, representing the Young Finnish Party until 1918 and the National Coalition Party thereafter. He was born in Kivennapa, and was the elder brother of Erkki Paavolainen and the father of Olavi Paavolainen.

References

1868 births
1930 deaths
People from Vyborg District
People from Viipuri Province (Grand Duchy of Finland)
Young Finnish Party politicians
National Coalition Party politicians
Members of the Parliament of Finland (1913–16)
Members of the Parliament of Finland (1916–17)
Members of the Parliament of Finland (1917–19)
People of the Finnish Civil War (White side)
University of Helsinki alumni